Hovhannes Davtyan  (born on January 9, 1985), is an Armenian actor. He is known for his roles as Mkho (Mekhak) Arevshatyan on In The Army and In The City . He was a guest of Sixth Sense on March 18, 2016 and a guest for Name that Tune on 2016 February 9. Hovhannes is now a stand up comedian, and has his own stand-up theatre show.

Filmography

References

External links 

 https://www.facebook.com/HovhannesDavtyanStandup/

1985 births
Living people
Male actors from Yerevan
Armenian male film actors
21st-century Armenian male actors